Andrés Alfonso González (born 22 June 1990) is a Venezuelan footballer who plays as a goalkeeper for Zulia F.C. in the Venezuelan Primera División.

References

External links

1990 births
Living people
Venezuelan footballers
Monagas S.C. players
Asociación Civil Deportivo Lara players
Zulia F.C. players
Venezuelan Primera División players
Association football goalkeepers
People from Miranda (state)
21st-century Venezuelan people